is a 1982 Japanese film directed by Shunya Itō.

Cast
 Kenichi Hagiwara
 Rumiko Koyanagi
 Hiroshi Miyauchi
 Fujita Okamoto
 Kumiko Akiyoshi
 Shin Takuma
 Akira Nakao
 Shiro Ito

Awards
6th Japan Academy Prize 
 Won: Best Supporting Actress - Rumiko Koyanagi
 Won: Best Cinematographer - Shinsaku Himeda
 Nominated: Best Film
 Nominated: Best Director - Shunya Itō
 Nominated: Best Screenplay - Hirō Matsuda
 Nominated: Best Actor - Kenichi Hagiwara
 Nominated: Best Supporting Actress - Kumiko Akiyoshi

References

External links
 

1982 films
Films directed by Shunya Itō
Films scored by Shunsuke Kikuchi
1980s Japanese films